Eriope is a genus of plants in the family Lamiaceae, first described in 1833. It is native to South America, many of the species endemic to Brazil.

Species
Eriope alpestris Mart. ex Benth. - Minas Gerais
Eriope anamariae Harley - Bahia
Eriope angustifolia Epling - Minas Gerais
Eriope arenaria Harley - Minas Gerais
Eriope blanchetii (Benth.) Harley - northeastern Brazil
Eriope complicata Mart. ex Benth. - Brazil
Eriope confusa Harley - Bahia
Eriope crassifolia Mart. ex Benth. - Bahia
Eriope crassipes Benth. - Brazil, Paraguay, Venezuela, French Guiana, Bolivia, Colombia
Eriope exaltata Harley - Bahia
Eriope filifolia Benth. - Minas Gerais
Eriope foetida A.St.-Hil. ex Benth. - Brazil
Eriope glandulosa (Harley) Harley - Bahia, Minas Gerais
Eriope hypenioides Mart. ex Benth. - Bahia
Eriope hypoleuca (Benth.) Harley - Bahia, Minas Gerais
Eriope latifolia (Mart. ex Benth.) Harley - eastern Brazil
Eriope luetzelburgii Harley - Bahia
Eriope machrisae (Epling) Harley - Goiás
Eriope macrostachya Mart. ex Benth. - Brazil, Paraguay, Venezuela
Eriope montana Harley - Bahia
Eriope monticola Mart. ex Benth. - Bahia
Eriope obovata Epling - northeastern Brazil
Eriope parvifolia Mart. ex Benth. - Brazil
Eriope polyphylla Mart. ex Benth. - Bahia
Eriope salviifolia (Pohl ex Benth.) Harley - Bahia, Minas Gerais
Eriope sincorana Harley - Bahia
Eriope tumidicaulis Harley - Bahia
Eriope velutina Epling - Brazil
Eriope xavantium Harley - Mato Grosso

References

Lamiaceae
Lamiaceae genera
Taxa named by Aimé Bonpland
Taxa named by Alexander von Humboldt